Debra Anne Byrne (born 30 March 1957), formerly billed as Debbie Byrne, is an Australian pop singer, variety entertainer, theatre and TV actress and writer, director and choreographer of cabaret. From April 1971 to March 1975 she was a founding cast member of Young Talent Time. She started her solo singing career with a cover version of "He's a Rebel" (March 1974), which peaked at No. 25 on the Go-Set Australian Singles chart. At the Logie Awards of 1974 she won Best Teenage Personality and followed with the Queen of Pop Award in October – both ceremonies were sponsored by TV Week. She repeated both wins in the following year.

As a stage actress Byrne appeared in the Australian musical theatre versions of Cats (July 1985 to mid-1987), Les Misérables (November 1987 to May 1988, December 1989 to June 1990) and Sunset Boulevard (October 1996 to June 1997). Her solo album, Caught in the Act (April 1991), peaked at No. 2 on the ARIA Albums Chart and was certified gold. In 2006 Byrne published her autobiography, Not Quite Ripe: A Memoir.

Career

Early career as pop singer
In 1969 Debra "Debbie" Byrne made her television debut on Brian and the Juniors, a children's variety and talent quest, which was hosted by newsreader Brian Naylor. She stayed with the show for 12 months until it finished late in 1970. In April 1971 she became an original cast member on Young Talent Time, another children's talent quest, which was hosted by Johnny Young. Byrne proved to be a popular cast member: in March 1974 she won the Logie Award for Best Teenage Personality and the TV Week Queen of Pop Award in October.

In March 1974, before leaving the Young Talent Time regular cast, Byrne released her first solo single, "He's a Rebel", a cover version of the Phil Spector-produced 1962 hit by the Crystals. It peaked at No. 25 on the Go-Set Top 40 Australian Singles chart, and reached No. 1 on the Melbourne charts. Her debut album, She's a Rebel (1974), was produced by Young, with session musicians including Russell Dunlop on drums (ex-Aesops Fables, SCRA, Renée Geyer and Mother Earth, Johnny Rocco Band), Tim Partridge on bass guitar (Company Caine, Mighty Kong, Kevin Borich Express), Mark Punch on guitar (Johnny Rocco Band, Renée Geyer Band) and Terry Walker on guitar and backing vocals (the Strangers, Pastoral Symphony).

Byrne's follow-up single was a second Crystals cover, "Da Doo Ron Ron" (January 1975), backed by the track, "Boogie Man". In that year she won both the Logie Award for Best Teenage Personality and the TV Week Queen of Pop Award for a second time. In September 1975 Byrne travelled to London to record at Abbey Road Studios with Cliff Richard producing. While in London, she made public and TV appearances, including on The Cliff Richard Show.

Byrne's first Australian television guest appearance as a featured solo artist was on The Graham Kennedy Show at the age of fifteen. Since then she has made a guest appearance on every major Australian Tonight show and was a regular performer on the Australian Broadcasting Corporation (ABC) series, The Saturday Show. In 1978 she merged singing with acting for the first time on the ABC's Follies series. From August 1980 Byrne co-starred alongside John Farnham in their own series, Farnham and Byrne. Craig Walsh of The Australian Women's Weekly previewed a segment for a rock 'n' roll themed episode, "[its] staging promises to make the series the smash hit of 1980, say the producers" with Byrne declaring "I've just discovered I can dance better than I thought."

Byrne's career stalled between 1980 and 1985 due to her heroin addiction, for which she undertook rehab at Odyssey House. A further stumbling block occurred when a sex tape of her and a former partner was stolen and leaked to the media.

In mid-1985, Byrne recorded her second solo album, The Persuader, which was produced by Peter Dawkins. She issued the single "The Persuader" in August, but neither single or album charted.
She made a successful and highly publicised career comeback in 1985 with the starring role as Kathy McLeod, opposite Matt Dillon, in the feature film, Rebel. She was nominated for an AFI Award for Best Actress in a Lead Role for the performance. Byrne sang lead vocals on nine of ten tracks on Rebel: Original Motion Picture Soundtrack (1985).

Cabaret and concert performances
Byrne's live cabaret, Caught in the Act Again, commenced during mid-1999, it included both show tunes and some original material. The first half was "a little too low-key, mostly because the songs all have a similar, slow, acid-jazzy tempo" according to Fiona Scott-Norman of The Age. She was backed by John McAll on piano and Don Hirini as backing vocalist; she also co-wrote some material, including "I Don't Make the Rules", with Hirini. Caught in the Act Again earned a Green Room Award nomination for Best Cabaret Performance and Best Musical Arrangement.

Her cabaret work includes writing, directing, choreographing and starring in Girls, Girls, Girls from May to June 2002. The show also starred Wendy Stapleton and Lisa Edwards (replaced by Nikki Nicholls) as a tribute to the Supremes, Cilla Black, Dusty Springfield, Patsy Cline and Lulu. In 2002 it won the Herald Sun Best Cabaret Award. The shows had sold out before they opened. In subsequent years Byrne, Stapleton and Nicholls periodically resumed Girls, Girls, Girls.

Since 1972 Byrne has been a regular performer at the Christmas Eve Carols by Candlelight concert at Melbourne's Sidney Myer Music Bowl. At the 2005 concert she performed a duet of Silent Night with her five-year-old daughter, Lucille, who was making her professional stage and television debut. In late 2006 her autobiography, Not Quite Ripe: A Memoir, was published on Pan Macmillan. She described how the book took her four years to write, "On and off. I wrote and I didn't write." Byrne reprised her role of Grizabella in the ExitLeft production of Cats, which was staged at the Derwent Entertainment Centre in Hobart in late-October 2007.

2009–present: stage and television roles
In April 2009 Byrne played the role of Sue Barnes in Metro Street at its world premiere in Adelaide and its subsequent tour to South Korea, with an appearance at the Daegu International Musical Festival (see Daegu) in June.

From 29 July 2010 to April 2011 she played the role of the Bird Woman in the original Australian production of the stage musical, Mary Poppins at Melbourne's Her Majesty's Theatre. She reprised the role in its Sydney run at the Capitol Theatre. From May to June 2012 Byrne played the role of Claire Christie in the Nine Network's Tricky Business.

From February to March 2014 she appeared on a dramatised crime biography, Fat Tony & Co., portraying Judy Moran, wife of Lewis Moran who was part of the Carlton Crew which were involved in the Melbourne gangland killings. Fat Tony & Co. focused on the rise and fall of convicted drug mastermind, Tony Mokbel, and is an offshoot to the first series of Underbelly (February–May 2008). Byrne described her portrayal of Moran "You'd be surprised what I wear as Judy that's from my own wardrobe [...] There's a definite air of the theatrical about her and a lot of what I saw Judy wearing ... I thought she wore some really nice clothes. Everything she wore was so over the top."

In 2016 she took the role of Carlotta Campion in a concert version of Follies at the Melbourne Recital Hall for a limited run of three performances in May. In August she worked with Vika Bull in their Carole King tribute show, Tapestry. In late 2016, Byrne appeared on the third series of ABC comedy, Upper Middle Bogan.

From 2017 through to 2019, she toured with Vika Bull in their Carole King tribute show 'Tapestry'.

In mid 2019, she is set to play the Beggar Woman in a production of Sweeney Todd: The Demon Barber of Fleet Street opposite Anthony Warlow and Gina Riley.

Filmography

Film

Television

Stage

Theatre

Cabaret

Personal life
Debra Anne Byrne was born on 30 March 1957 in Fitzroy to Norman Owen Byrne (born ca. 19282014) and Verna Alice née Reid (ca. 19301980). She was the fifth of six children, her siblings are Lynda (died 2002), Cheryl, Sandra (died 1970), Peter and Robyn. She also has a younger half sister, Rebecca. Norman worked as an engineering foreman; he became violent when drunk. According to Byrne she was sexually abused by her maternal grandfather, Ken Reid, from a young age until 13. In 1993 Byrne dropped the usage of "Debbie" as her first name.

During her stint in Young Talent Time Byrne had a sexual relationship with "Michael", an on-set boom-camera operator: she was under-age and he was more than ten years older. She later recalled, "I didn't feel protected at all. The attitude was, 'It's over now, it's finished', but this was personal and embarrassing and humiliating and distressing ... Parents need to be aware that even now, with the best protections in place, there's going to be someone who cares more for the product than the child. No law can change that."

In February 1975 she was hospitalised due to "a nervous collapse brought on by a strenuous touring campaign." Her support slot on a tour for United States singer, Gene Pitney, was taken up by Samantha Sang. Byrne described how "I was drinking, smoking, barely eating, and spending a lot of time in hotel rooms fighting anxiety and depression."

By October 1978 Byrne was married to David John Dudley (born ca. 1956) and the couple lived in Elwood. In that month the pair were cleared of drugs charges; Byrne declared that "she knew of some entertainers who had 'come to grief' by being associated with drugs. She had been to one or two parties where drugs were being used but she did not mix with that section of the entertainment industry." Later she recalled meeting Dudley at a party where her "latest boyfriend was an everyday dope smoker and I loved the freedom the drug gave me." They had a daughter together, Arja. Her marriage to Dudley broke-up in 1980 and her mother died in that year.

Debra gave birth to her second daughter, Lauren, who was fathered by director Chris Webb.

During 1987 while rehearsing for her role of Fantine in the Australian theatre production of Les Misérables, Byrne met fellow actor, Neil Melville. By June 1989 the couple were planning their wedding. Byrne and Melville separated in November 1996 and later divorced.

Byrne's performances as Norma Desmond on Sunset Boulevard from October 1996 to June 1997 were interrupted by "her frequent and sudden absences from the show [which] were partially blamed for the show's lack of success" despite "great critical notices." She had attempted suicide late in 1997 and was being treated by a psychiatrist to feel "more focused and driven than ever before." She was diagnosed with clinical depression and undertook a course of prescription medication. In March 1998 she told Peter Ford of Playbill that "Nobody ever bothered to investigate if that was my major problem, when finally I had a label for my troubles it was a great relief."

Byrne was the domestic partner of French musician, Ced Le Meledo, with whom she collaborated on the live show, Paris-Melbourne. They had one daughter together, Lucille Le Meledo (b. 12 July 2000). The couple separated in 2006. Her daughter eventually made her theatrical debut in 2011 as the title role in Annie.

 In that same year her autobiography, Not Quite Ripe: A Memoir, was released and described by her publisher as "the real story of her gritty, sometimes perilous existence as she chased her career, became addicted to heroin and finally rehabilitated herself".

As of 2019, she lives in Melbourne with her daughter Lucille and two of her grandsons whom she has custody of.

Discography

Studio albums
 She's a Rebel (1974)
 The Persuader (1985)
 Caught in the Act(1991)
 Sleeping Child (1994)
 New Ways to Dream (1997)

Soundtrack appearances
 Cats - Original Australian Cast Recording (1985)
 Rebel - Original Motion Picture Soundtrack (1985)
 Les Miserables - The World Symphonic Recording (1988)
 Mary Poppins - Original Australian Cast Recording (2010)

Awards and nominations

ARIA Music Awards
The ARIA Music Awards is an annual awards ceremony that recognises excellence, innovation, and achievement across all genres of Australian music. They commenced in 1987.

|-
| ARIA Music Awards of 1992
| Caught in the Act
| ARIA Award for Best Adult Contemporary Album
|

King of Pop Awards
The King of Pop Awards were voted by the readers of TV Week. The King of Pop award started in 1967 and ran through to 1978.

|-
| 1974
| herself
| Queen of Pop 
| 
|-
| 1975
| herself
| Queen of Pop 
| 
|-

Logie Awards
The Logie Awards (officially the TV Week Logie Awards) is an annual gathering to celebrate Australian television, sponsored and organised by magazine TV Week, with the first ceremony in 1959. The awards represent both public and industry voted awards.

|-
| 1974
| herself
| Best Teenage Personality
| 
|-
| 1975
| herself
| Best Teenage Personality
| 
|}

Mo Awards
The Australian Entertainment Mo Awards (commonly known informally as the Mo Awards), were annual Australian entertainment industry awards. They recognise achievements in live entertainment in Australia from 1975 to 2016. Byrne won three awards in that time.
 (wins only)
|-
| 1985
| Debbie Byrne
| Female Vocal Entertainer of the Year
| 
|-
| 1988
| Debbie Byrne
| Female Musical Theatre Performer of the Year
| 
|-
| 1989
| Debbie Byrne
| Female Musical Theatre Performer of the Year
| 
|-

Other awards
 1985 AFI Award nomination for Best Actress in a Lead Role for Rebel
 1991 Grammy Award for Best Theatre Musical Soundtrack, shared with cast of The World Symphonic Recording of Les Misérables,
 2002 Herald Sun Best Cabaret Award for Girls, Girls, Girls,
 Green Room Award nomination for Best Cabaret Performance and Best Musical Arrangement for Caught in the Act Again,
 2009 Daegu Musical Award for Best Actress for Metro Street.

Bibliography

References

 Turner, G., Cunningham, S., The Australian TV Book, Allen and Unwin, NSW, 2000. 
 Young terror time
 Sunset Boulevard press release
 A taste of Broadway
 Australian Child Stars of the Century
 Deb's little girl Byrnes bright
 Girls, Girls, Girls
 1985 Mo Award Winners
 Original idols still send their loving
 Where are they now?

External links

1957 births
Living people
Australian child actresses
Australian women pop singers
Australian songwriters
Australian television actresses
Australian women writers
Australian autobiographers
Logie Award winners
Singers from Melbourne
Women autobiographers